Royat (Occitan: Roiat) is a commune in the Puy-de-Dôme department in Auvergne-Rhône-Alpes in central France. As of 2019, its population was 4,359.

Since Roman times, its thermal springs have made it a spa town, and the remains of the Roman baths are still visible.

Population

Points of interest
 Arboretum de Royat
 Jardin botanique d'Auvergne

International relations

Royat is twinned with Abertyleri, Blaenau Gwent, Wales.

See also
Communes of the Puy-de-Dôme department

References

Further reading

External links

  Official website
  Unofficial website
  Office of tourism website

Communes of Puy-de-Dôme
Spa towns in France